WHJT (93.5 FM, "93.5 The Legend) is an American radio station licensed to serve Kearney Park, Mississippi, United States.  The station was owned and operated by Mississippi College until 2017.  Its studios and transmitter were based on campus from the Aven Fine Arts Building.

Mississippi College sold WHJT to New South Radio in March 2017.  The station's new 12,000-watt transmitter is located off Highway 49, in Pocahontas.  Its new studio is located at 265 Highpoint Drive, in Ridgeland.

WHJT had previously broadcast a contemporary Christian format to the Jackson, Mississippi, area from Easter Sunday 1989 until midnight on July 31, 2017. On July 31, WHJT changed its format from Christian contemporary to classic country, and is now branded as "93.5 The Legend" (format moved from Flinn Broadcasting-owned WJXN-FM 100.9 Utica, which began stunting).

The station was assigned the call sign "WHJT" by the Federal Communications Commission (FCC).

WHJT-HD2
On July 14, 2021 WHJT launched a blues format on its HD2 subchannel, branded as "Blues 93.1" (format moved from WIIN 780 AM Ridgeland, which flipped to rhythmic oldies).

Previous logo

References

External links
WHJT official website

HJT
Radio stations established in 1974
Hinds County, Mississippi
1974 establishments in Mississippi
Classic country radio stations in the United States